Athletes have competed as independent Olympians at the Olympic Games for various reasons, including political transition, international sanctions, suspensions of National Olympic Committees, and compassion. Independent athletes have come from North Macedonia, East Timor, South Sudan and Curaçao following geopolitical changes in the years before the Olympics, from the Federal Republic of Yugoslavia (present-day Montenegro and Serbia) as a result of international sanctions, from India and Kuwait due to the suspensions of their National Olympic Committees, and from Russia for mass violations of anti-doping rules.

Medals were won by independent Olympians at the 1992 and 2016 Olympics, both times in shooting. The naming and country code conventions for these independent Olympians have not been consistent. Independent Paralympians have participated at Paralympic Games for the same reasons as independent Olympians.

Precursors
Prior to the 1906 Intercalated Games, entry was not restricted to teams nominated by National Olympic Committees (NOCs). Mixed-nationality teams competed in some team events. Participants in individual events are retrospectively credited to their nationality of the time.

The 1940 Winter Olympics was reassigned to Garmisch-Partenkirchen in spring 1939. In concert with Nazi German claims on Czechoslovakia, the organisers refused to recognise the Czechoslovakia NOC; however they were prepared to allow its athletes to enter under the Olympic flag. In any event, the Games were cancelled because of World War II.

In the Cold War, some athletes who emigrated from Communist Europe countries were unable to compete at the Olympics, as their original state's NOC neither wanted them on its own team nor gave them permission to transfer nationality. Some applied to compete as individuals in 1952 and 1956 but were refused.

When Guyana joined the 1976 Olympic boycott, its sprinter James Gilkes asked the IOC to be allowed to compete as an individual, but was refused.

The IOC first made provisions for athletes to compete under the Olympic flag in time for the 1980 Summer Olympics in Moscow. Some NOCs, mostly from Western Europe, wished to attend the Games despite their governments' support for the American-led boycott in protest of the Soviet invasion of Afghanistan. The NOCs hesitated to use national symbols without government approval, so the IOC relaxed this requirement: 14 NOCs competed under the Olympic flag, while three, New Zealand, Spain and Portugal, competed under their respective NOCs' flag.

1992 Winter and Summer Olympics

Independent Olympic participants

During the 1992 Summer Olympics, athletes from the Federal Republic of Yugoslavia and the Republic of Macedonia competed as independent Olympic participants. Macedonian athletes could not appear under their own flag because their National Olympic Committee (NOC) had not been formed. The Federal Republic of Yugoslavia (Serbia and Montenegro) was under United Nations sanctions which prevented the country from taking part in the Olympics. However, individual Yugoslav athletes were allowed to take part as independent Olympic participants.  58 athletes competed as independent Olympic participants, winning three medals.

Unified Team

The former Soviet Union (except the Baltic states) competed under the Olympic flag at the 1992 Winter Olympics and 1992 Summer Olympics as a Unified Team.

2000 Summer Olympics

At the 2000 Summer Olympics, four athletes from East Timor competed as Individual Olympic Athletes during the country's transition to independence.

2012 Summer Olympics

Four athletes competed as independent Olympic Athletes at the 2012 Summer Olympics.

After the dissolution of the Netherlands Antilles and subsequent withdrawal of the country's National Olympic Committee, three athletes from the country who qualified for the Games were allowed to compete independently. Several others competed for either Aruba or the Netherlands.

The National Olympic Committee for South Sudan was not established between the formation of that state and the 2012 Olympic qualifying. One athlete from South Sudan, Guor Marial, qualified for the Games and was allowed to compete as an independent.

Athletes from Kuwait were originally allowed to compete as Independent Olympic Athletes as well, because their National Olympic Committee (NOC) was suspended. However, the NOC was reinstated allowing the athletes to compete under their own flag. Kuwait competed under the Olympic flag at the 2010 Summer Youth Olympics and 2010 Asian Games.

2014 Winter Olympics

The Indian Olympic Association was suspended from the IOC in December 2012, due to problems with its electoral process. New elections were scheduled for 9 February 2014, two days after the start of the 2014 Winter Olympics. Therefore, the three Indian athletes who qualified for the Games were scheduled to compete as independent Olympic participants.

On 8 and 9 February, Shiva Keshavan participated in the luge competition and received 38th place.  He would end up being the only athlete to officially participate as an Independent Olympic Participant.

On 11 February 2014, the IOC reinstated the Indian Olympic Association after Narayana Ramachandran, the president of the World Squash Federation, was voted in as the new president of the Indian Olympic Association, allowing the two remaining athletes to compete under the Indian flag rather than as independent athletes. This was the first time such a reinstatement of a NOC occurred as the Olympic Games were underway.

2016 Summer Olympics 

Kuwaiti athletes competed as independent, as the Kuwait Olympic Committee was suspended by the International Olympic Committee due to governmental interference. This was the second suspension in five years; the first suspension resulted in Kuwaiti athletes being forced to compete under the Olympic flag as Athletes from Kuwait for the 2010 Asian Games. Fehaid Al-Deehani became the first Independent Olympic Athlete to win a gold medal. Like with gold medalists of the Unified Team at the 1992 Winter and Summer Olympics, the Olympic Hymn was played in the victory ceremony.

Refugees were allowed to compete under the Olympic Flag at the 2016 Summer Olympics, under the label Refugee Olympic Team. Ten athletes from four countries competed for this team.

Due to widespread state-controlled doping in Russia, the International Association of Athletics Federations suspended the All-Russia Athletic Federation in November 2015. As a result, no Russian athlete would able to compete internationally, including the 2016 Olympics, until the suspension was lifted. The IAAF announced a path for athletes who train outside the Russia system and could prove themselves to be clean, as well as those who have helped in the fight against doping, to be eligible to compete as neutral athletes at the 2016 Olympics. Two athletes, Darya Klishina and Yuliya Stepanova were initially cleared for competition, as Independent Athletes.

Although Yulia Stepanova was cleared by IAAF because of her revelations regarding Russia's systemic doping program, and IOC's recognition of her "contribution to the protection and promotion of clean athletes", she was banned by the IOC in line with the decision to ban all Russian athletes with previous doping convictions. IOC also rejected the suggestion that 'neutral' athletes could compete outside of national selection. Klishina was subsequently confirmed as competing under Russian colours, their only competitor in athletics at the 2016 Olympics.

2018 Winter Olympics 

On 5 December 2017, the IOC announced that Russia would be banned from the 2018 Winter Olympics over its state-sponsored doping program. Russian athletes were allowed to participate under the Olympic flag as "Olympic Athletes from Russia" (OAR) if they were cleared by a panel, which was chaired by Valerie Fourneyron and had representatives from the IOC, the World Anti-Doping Agency, and the Doping Free Sport Unit of the Global Association of International Sports Federations.

2020 Summer Olympics 

The IOC Refugee Olympic Team competed at the 2020 Summer Olympics in Tokyo, Japan, as independent Olympic participants. Twenty-nine athletes from 12 sports and 18 countries competed for this team. The IOC code was changed to the French acronym "EOR" which stands for Équipe olympique des réfugiés.

Following a decision by the World Anti-Doping Agency (WADA), it was announced that Russia would compete under the acronym "ROC", after the name of the Russian Olympic Committee. On aftermatch, the IOC announced that the Russian national flag would be substituted by the flag of the Russian Olympic Committee. It would also be allowed to use team uniforms featuring the Russian national colours, the logo of the Russian Olympic Committee and bearing the acronym "ROC".

2022 Winter Olympics 

Following a decision by the World Anti-Doping Agency (WADA), it was announced that Russia would compete under the acronym "ROC", after the name of the Russian Olympic Committee. On aftermatch, the IOC announced that the Russian national flag would be substituted by the flag of the Russian Olympic Committee. It would also be allowed to use team uniforms featuring the Russian national colours, the logo of the Russian Olympic Committee and bearing the acronym "ROC".

See also
 Independent Paralympians at the Paralympic Games
 List of flag bearers for Independent Olympians at the Olympics
 Refugee Olympic Team at the Olympics

Footnotes

References

Citations

Sources

External links
 
 
 

 
Independent athletes
Doping in Russia